The 1996 United States Senate election in Alabama was held on November 5, 1996. Incumbent Democratic U.S. Senator Howell Heflin decided to retire. Republican Jeff Sessions won the open seat, becoming the first of his party to win this seat since Reconstruction and only the second Republican ever to be popularly elected to the U.S. Senate from Alabama.

Background
In the 1968 presidential election, Alabama supported native son and American Independent Party candidate George Wallace over both Richard Nixon and Hubert Humphrey. Wallace was the official Democratic candidate in Alabama, while Humphrey was listed as the "National Democratic". In 1976, Democratic candidate Jimmy Carter from Georgia carried the state, the region, and the nation, but Democratic control of the region slipped after that.

Since 1980, conservative Alabama voters have increasingly voted for Republican candidates at the Federal level, especially in Presidential elections. By contrast, Democratic candidates have been elected to many state-level offices and, until 2010, comprised a longstanding majority in the Alabama Legislature.

Three-term incumbent Howell Heflin decided not to seek re-election. A 75-year-old moderate-to-conservative Democrat, Heflin was re-elected in 1990 with over 60% of the vote. Until 2017, 
Heflin remained the last member of the Democratic Party to win a Senate seat in Republican-turning Alabama (his colleague, Richard Shelby, elected twice as a Democrat, switched his party affiliation to Republican in 1994).

Democratic primary

Candidates
 Roger Bedford, State Senator
 Marilyn Q. Bromberg
 Glen Browder, U.S. Representative since 1989
 Natalie Davis, professor of political science at Birmingham-Southern College

Results

Republican primary

Candidates
 Jimmy Blake, Birmingham City Councilman
 Walter D. Clark, podiatrist and Vietnam veteran
 Albert Lipscomb, State Senator
 Sid McDonald, former State Senator
 Frank McRight, attorney and Democratic nominee for AL-01 in 1984
 Jeff Sessions, Alabama Attorney General
 Charles Woods, businessman and perennial candidate

Results

General election

Candidates
 Roger Bedford (D), State Senator
 Charles Hebner (NL), activist
 Jeff Sessions (R), Attorney General of Alabama
 Mark Thornton (L), economist

Results

See also 
 1996 United States Senate elections

References 

1996
1996 Alabama elections
Alabama